Lost Moon: The Perilous Voyage of Apollo 13 (published in paperback as Apollo 13), is a 1994 non-fiction book by astronaut Jim Lovell and journalist Jeffrey Kluger, about the failed April 1970 Apollo 13 lunar landing mission which Lovell commanded. The book is the basis of the 1995 film adaptation Apollo 13, directed by Ron Howard and starring Tom Hanks as Lovell.

Lovell was initially approached by Kluger in 1991 about collaborating on the book. Fred Haise was not interested in the collaboration, and Jack Swigert had died of cancer in 1982.

Background
Apollo 13 was the third mission of the Apollo program intended to land men on the Moon. An explosion of an onboard liquid oxygen tank in the Service Module, when the craft was close to reaching the Moon, crippled the electrical power generation and propulsion systems for the Command Module Odyssey. This necessitated the abort of the lunar landing, and placed the lives of astronauts Lovell, Jack Swigert, and Fred Haise in serious jeopardy. The mission became famous for the safe return of the men, made possible by the flight controllers' resourceful adaptation of the electrical, propulsion, and life support systems of the LM (Lunar Module) Aquarius as a "lifeboat".

Physical description
 Hardcover, 378 pages
 Publisher: Houghton Mifflin (T) (October 1994)
 Language: English
 
 Dimensions: 1.5 × 6.2 × 9.2 inches

See also

 The Right Stuff (1979 book) by Tom Wolfe, about the U.S. side of the Space Race

References

Bibliography
 
 
 
1994 non-fiction books
Apollo program
American non-fiction books
Non-fiction books adapted into films
Houghton Mifflin books
Non-fiction novels
Apollo 13
Aviation books
Spaceflight books
Jim Lovell
Books by astronauts